Riyadh Hassan Al-Ibrahim (Arabic: رياض حسن البراهيم; born 15 December 1993) is a football (soccer) player who currently plays for Al-Khaleej as a winger.

Honours
Hajer
First Division: 2013–14

Al-Khaleej 
First Division: 2021–22

References

External links
 

1993 births
Living people
People from Al-Hasa
Saudi Arabian footballers
Association football midfielders
Ittihad FC players
Al Omran Club players
Hajer FC players
Al Batin FC players
Al-Raed FC players
Al-Ain FC (Saudi Arabia) players
Jeddah Club players
Al-Nojoom FC players
Khaleej FC players
Saudi First Division League players
Saudi Professional League players
Saudi Arabian Shia Muslims